Ivor James CBE (1882–1963) was a British cellist. He taught for many years at the Royal College of Music; among his pupils were those who became notable cellists.

Life
James studied under William Whitehouse at the Royal College of Music. After graduating he joined the English String Quartet, at a time when its viola player was Frank Bridge.

In 1919 he became William Whitehouse's assistant at the Royal College of Music, and he subsequently taught at the college for 34 years. In his teaching, he was concerned that there should be a strong technical base; also that, in achieving a good interpretation, the line of the music should be considered. His pupils included James Whitehead, Amaryllis Fleming and Martin Lovett.

He married a former pupil, Helen Just, in 1928. She was a fellow professor at the college, and a member of the English String Quartet. In 1928 James was made a Fellow of the Royal College of Music (FRCM).

In 1929 he founded a summer school at Westminster College, Cambridge, sponsored by the British Federation of Music Festivals; it is regarded as the first of its kind. In the 1930s he was a member of the Menges Quartet.

James was appointed CBE in 1953.

In an obituary in 1963 in the Royal College of Music Union Magazine was written: "He truly felt music to its very depth and centre. He communicated his musical intention to his pupils in some remarkable way which seems impossible to put into words."

References

1882 births
1963 deaths
20th-century classical musicians
British classical cellists
Alumni of the Royal College of Music
Academics of the Royal College of Music
Commanders of the Order of the British Empire
20th-century cellists